The S-500 Prometey, also known as 55R6M "Triumfator-M", is a Russian hypersonic surface-to-air missile/anti-ballistic missile  system replacing the A-135 missile system currently in use, and supplementing the S-400. The S-500 was developed by the Almaz-Antey Air Defence Concern. Initially planned to be in production by 2014, the first unit entered service in 2021 with the 15th Air Army.

History
Although sharing a similar designation with the S-500U project of the late 1960s, the relationship between the two remains unclear. The S-500U multichannel anti-aircraft system was a 1968 initiative by the Soviet Air Defence Forces, Soviet Navy, Ministry of the Radio Industry (Ministerstvo Radio Promyshlennosti SSSR), and Ministry of the Shipbuilding Industry to create a unified complex for the National Air Defence Troops, navy and ground troops. The S-500U SAM complex project was rejected by the Soviet Army, which had a requirement to engage not only enemy aircraft, but also short-range ballistic missiles. Consequently, the S-300 family (SA-10 and SA-12) was developed instead.

According to the original plans, ten S-500 battalions were to be purchased for the Russian Aerospace Defense (VKO) under the State Armament Programme 2020 (GPV-2020).

The S-500s will work in parallel with S-400s and together are planned to replace the S-300 missile systems. The first units are planned to be deployed around the Moscow oblast and the country's central area. A naval version is the likely armament for the new Lider-class destroyer, which was to enter service after 2020 but is not operational as of 2022.

CEO of Rostec Corporation Sergey Chemezov declared the beginning of S-500 production on 30 June 2019. Despite that, serial production of the first 10 systems (ordered in late 2020) only begun in 2021. A new contract was signed in August 2022.

Testing
In May 2018, Russia conducted the longest range surface-to-air missile test to date with the S-500. According to reports citing unnamed sources familiar with U.S. intelligence on the program, the S-500 was able to hit a target 482 km (300 mi) away, which is 80 km further than the previous record.

On 4 June 2019, the Russian Ministry of Defense posted a video showing the successful launch of a new anti ballistic missile system in the form of a long range surface to air missile. Though the nature of the air defence system which was being tested was not mentioned it has been widely speculated to have been a test of the S-500 Prometheus long range surface to air missile system.

The S-500 radar was tested in late 2019.

As of July 2021, the Russian MOD has released the first public footage of a live-fire test of the new S-500 anti-ballistic missile system at Kapustin Yar.

Operational history

The first S-500 regiment went on combat duty in Moscow on 13 October 2021.

Design 
The S-500 is designed for intercepting and destroying intercontinental ballistic missiles, as well as hypersonic cruise missiles and aircraft, for air defense against Airborne Early Warning and Control and for jamming aircraft. It also aims at destroying hypersonic cruise missiles and other aerial targets at speeds of higher than Mach 5, as well as spacecraft. It is effective against ballistic missiles with a launch range of 3,500 km (2,200 mi), the radar reaches a radius of 3,000 km (1,300 km for the EPR 0,1 square meter). Other targets it has been announced to defend against include unmanned aerial vehicles, low Earth orbit satellites, space weapons launched from hypersonic aircraft, and hypersonic orbital platforms.

The system is mobile and has rapid deployability. Experts believe that the system's capabilities can affect enemy intercontinental ballistic missiles at the middle and end portions of flight, but reports by Almaz-Antey say that the external target-designation system (RLS Voronezh-DM and missile defence system A-135 radar Don-2N) will be capable of mid-early flight portion interceptions of enemy ballistic missiles, which is one of the final stages of the S-500 project. It is to have a response time of less than 4 seconds (Compared to the S-400's less than 10).

Components
The S-500 consists of:

 77P6 launch vehicle, based on the BAZ-69096 10x10 truck
 55K6MA and 85Zh6-2 command posts, based on BAZ-69092-12 6x6
 91N6A(M) acquisition and battle management radar, a modification of the 91N6 (Big Bird) towed by the BAZ-6403.01 8x8 tractor
 96L6-TsP acquisition radar, an upgraded version of the 96L6 (Cheese Board) on BAZ-69096 10x10
 76T6 multimode engagement radar on BAZ-6909-022 8x8
 77T6 ABM engagement radar on BAZ-69096 10x10

The type of missiles used, especially for the long range ABM/ATBM role, has not been disclosed yet. It is likely to be a derivative of the SA-12B Giant two-stage ATBM, since the 77P6 launch vehicle is originally meant to carry 2 containers for the SA-12B. The other missiles, to be used against classical airborne targets, are likely to be the same as in the S-400 system.

Export
In September 2021, Russian Deputy Prime Minister Yury Borisov said that India could be a prospective, and probably the first, S-500 customer.

Also according to the Turkish President Recep Tayyip Erdoğan, Turkey is ready to consider possible S-500 purchases in the future.

See also
List of medium-range and long-range SAMs
S-300VM missile system
Vityaz missile system
A-135 anti-ballistic missile system
A-235 anti-ballistic missile system
Ground-Based Midcourse Defense
Medium Extended Air Defense System
Arrow 3
Arrow (Israeli missile)

References

External links

 
 .
 First S-500 missile complex to be put on combat alert in central Russia ITAR-TASS News Agency, 20 August 2014.

21st-century surface-to-air missiles
Surface-to-air missiles of Russia
Missile defense
Anti-ballistic missiles of Russia
Almaz-Antey products
Anti-satellite missiles
Weapons and ammunition introduced in 2021